(complete title in historical spelling: ; The Obligation of the First and Foremost Commandment), K. 35, is a sacred musical play (geistliches Singspiel) composed by Wolfgang Amadeus Mozart in 1767 when he was 11 years old. It is Mozart's first opera or, more specifically, sacred drama, as is suggested by the name. (The title page of the libretto ascribes it only to "J.A.W.".) Only the first part of the opera was composed by Mozart; the second and third parts were contributed by Michael Haydn and Anton Cajetan Adlgasser respectively. However, these other two parts have not survived. Part 1 of the opera was first performed on March 12, 1767, in the Knight's Hall of the Palace of the Archbishop, the Salzburg Residenz. Part 2 was performed on March 19, and part 3 on March 26.

Background and performance history
Mozart composed the work at age 11 with the help of his two teachers, Michael Haydn and Anton Cajetan Adlgasser. In Salzburg, dividing up a sacred singspiel between other composers was common. The libretto was written by Ignatz Anton von Weiser even though it was said that Johann Adam Wieland suggested the idea first and his name is written on the libretto. Mozart composed only the first part of the opera, and the others composed "part two" and "part three." However, these other two parts have not survived. The performances were predominantly in Salzburg in St. Peter's, in Cathedrals, on the Nonnberg, and in Residenz. The opera includes many recitatives for all of the characters, and each character sings one to three arias. The characters of the opera are two tenors: Christgeist and Christ (a Christian), and three sopranos: Barmherzigkeit, Gerechtigkeit, and Weltgeist. The opera does not have a chorus.

Part I of the opera was first performed on 12 March 1767 in the Knight's Hall of the Palace of the Archbishop, Salzburg. Part II was performed on 19 March, and Part III on 26 March.

Roles

Musical numbers
 Sinfonia Allegro
 Recitativo: Die löblich' und gerechte Bitte
 No. 1 Aria: Mit Jammer muß ich schauen
 Recitativo: So viele Seelen Fall
 No. 2 Aria: Ein ergrimmter Löwe brüllet
 Recitativo: Was glaubst du?
 No. 3 Aria: Erwache, fauler Knecht
 Recitativo: Er reget sich
 Recitativo: Wie, wer erwecket mich?
 No. 4 Aria: Hat der Schöpfer dieses Leben
 Recitativo: Daß Träume Träume sind
 No. 5 Aria: Jener Donnerworte Kraft
 Recitativo: Ist dieses, o so zweifle nimmermehr
 No. 6 Aria: Schildre einen Philosophen
 Recitativo: Wen hör' ich nun hier in der Nähe
 No. 7 Aria: Manches Übel
 Recitativo: Er halt mich einem Kranken gleich
 Recitativo: Hast du nunmehr erfahren
 No. 8 Terzetto: Laßt mir eurer Gnade Schein

Recordings
 1978 - Edith Mathis (Barmherzigkeit), Margaret Price (Gerechtigkeit), Lilian Sukis (Weltgeist), Norbert Orth (Christgeist), Claes H. Ahnsjö (Christ), Mozarteum-Orchester Salzburg, Wolfgang Sawallisch – 2 LPs Voce Records
 1980 – Sylvia Geszty (Barmherzigkeit), Krisztina Laki (Gerechtigkeit), Arleen Augér (Weltgeist), Werner Hollweg (Christgeist), Claes H. Ahnsjö (Christ) – Berliner Domkapelle, Roland Bader – 2 LPs Schwann Musica Sacra
 1989 – Margaret Anne Marshall (Barmherzigkeit), Ann Murray (Gerechtigkeit), Inga Nielsen (Weltgeist), Hans Peter Blochwitz (Christgeist), Aldo Baldin (Christ) – Radio-Sinfonieorchester Stuttgart, Neville Marriner – 2 CDs Philips Records

See also

 Oratorio
 List of operas by Mozart
 Classical music written in collaboration

References

External links 
 
  Libretto

Operas by Wolfgang Amadeus Mozart
German-language operas
Operas
Singspiele
1767 operas
Operas by multiple composers
Lost operas
Compositions by Michael Haydn